Jonathan Dickinson State Park is a Florida State Park and historic site located in Martin County, Florida, between Hobe Sound and Tequesta. The park includes the Elsa Kimbell Environmental Education and Research Center and a variety of natural habitats: sand pine scrub, pine flatwoods, mangroves, and river swamps. The Loxahatchee River, designated a National Wild and Scenic River in 1985 (the first in Florida), runs through the park. The park is also along the Ocean to Lake Trail. The park is at 16450 S.E. Federal Highway, Hobe Sound. The park is well known for its Camp Murphy Mountain Bike Trails.

History
The park is named after Jonathan Dickinson, a Quaker merchant who was shipwrecked in 1696, with his family and others, on the Florida coast near the present-day park. He wrote a journal describing their encounters with local tribes, and their journey up the coast to St. Augustine.

A man known as Trapper Nelson homesteaded on the banks of the Loxahatchee River after coming to the area in the 1930s, living off the land trapping and selling furs. He soon became known as the Wildman of the Loxahatchee. After he died in 1968 the state acquired his land, and deeded it to the park.

The United States Army established Camp Murphy, a top-secret radar training school, in the area that is now the park, in 1942. The camp included over 1,000 buildings, and housed more than 6,000 officers and soldiers. The camp was deactivated in 1944, after only two years of operation. Most of the camp buildings were torn down, but some of the building foundations remain. The property was transferred to the State of Florida in 1947, and opened as a state park in 1950.

Recreational activities
The park has such amenities as bicycling, boat tours, boating, cabins, canoeing, fishing, hiking, horse trails, kayaking, picnicking areas, swimming, wildlife viewing and full camping facilities. It also has the Elsa Kimbell Environmental Education and Research Center, with exhibits about the park's natural and cultural history.  The park operates a 44-passenger boat for tours of Trapper Nelson's homestead.

In film
Jonathan Dickinson State Park was used to film the first segment of the second episode of BBC's Walking with Monsters, set in Late Carboniferous Kansas.

Popular Mountain bike channels on YouTube such as BKXC and BCPOV have featured the park's Camp Murphy Mountain Bike trails.

Gallery

References and external links

 Jonathan Dickinson State Park at Florida State Parks
 Jonathan Dickinson State Park at State Parks of the United States
 Jonathan Dickinson State Park at Absolutely Florida

State parks of Florida
Parks in Martin County, Florida
Museums in Martin County, Florida
Nature centers in Florida
Natural history museums in Florida
Hobe Sound, Florida
Protected areas established in 1950
1950 establishments in Florida
Florida Native American Heritage Trail